Maria Valentina Plaza is the former governor and current representative of the first district of the Philippine province of Agusan del Sur. She was Agusan del Sur's second female governor.

Early life and education
Plaza is the daughter of former governors Democrito Plaza and Valentina Plaza. She is also the sister of incumbent governor Adolph Edward "Eddiebong" Plaza and former congressman Rodolfo "Ompong" Plaza. She graduated from the University of the Philippines Los Baños with a degree in agricultural business.

Political career

Governor
Although a neophyte, in 2007, Plaza chose to run for governor of Agusan del Sur with the help of her brother Eddiebong Plaza. She won as the second female governor after her mother.

Congresswoman
In the 2010 elections, Plaza was elected as the first representative of the newly created 1st district of the province of Agusan del Sur.

References

External links
 Provincial Board of Investment Website message
 5th National CBMS Conference Paper

1967 births
Living people
Governors of Agusan del Sur
Members of the House of Representatives of the Philippines from Agusan del Sur
Women members of the House of Representatives of the Philippines
Lakas–CMD politicians
National Unity Party (Philippines) politicians
University of the Philippines Los Baños alumni
Women provincial governors of the Philippines